The 2018 Louisiana Ragin' Cajuns softball team represented the University of Louisiana at Lafayette in the 2018 NCAA Division I softball season. The Ragin' Cajuns play their home games at Lamson Park and were led by first year head coach Gerry Glasco.

Preseason

Sun Belt Conference Coaches Poll
The Sun Belt Conference Coaches Poll was released on February 1, 2018. Louisiana was picked to finish second in the Sun Belt Conference behind the Texas State Bobcats softball team with 92 votes and 4 first place votes.

Preseason All-Sun Belt team
Randi Rupp (TXST, SR, Pitcher)
Devin Brown (USA, SR, Pitcher)
Ivie Drake (GSU, SR, Catcher)
Lexie Comeaux (LA, JR, Catcher)
Aileen Garcia (UTA, SO, 1st Base)
Kaleigh Todd (USA, SR, 2nd Base)
Sandra Mendoza (UTA, SR, 2nd Base)
Ariel Ortiz (TXST, SR, Shortstop)
Kristian Foster (USA, SR, Shortstop)
Alissa Dalton (LA, SO, Shortstop)
Kara Gremillion (LA, JR, 3rd Base)
Krista Rude (UTA, JR, Outfield)
Mekhia Freeman (GASO, SO, Outfield)
Kelli Martinez (LA, SR, Outfield)
Megan Litumbe (GSU, R-SR, Designated Pitcher)

Roster

Coaching staff

Schedule and results

Baton Rouge Regional

References

Louisiana
Louisiana Ragin' Cajuns softball seasons
Louisiana softball